Mask in Blue is a 1943 German musical comedy film directed by Paul Martin and starring Clara Tabody, Wolf Albach-Retty and Hans Moser.

It is an operetta film based on the stage work of the same name composed by Fred Raymond. The film was remade in Agfacolor by Georg Jacoby in 1953.

The film's sets were designed by the art director Heinrich Beisenherz and Alfred Bütow.

Cast
Clara Tabody as Gitta Stadelmann
Wolf Albach-Retty as Georg Harding
Hans Moser as Seehauser, Room Service Manager
Richard Romanowsky as Prof Sebastian Stadelmann
Ernst Waldow as Franz Stanzinger
Leo Peukert as Bommerlund, Theatre Director
Roma Bahn as Ilona Körössy
Josefine Dora as Hermine, Stadelmann's Housekeeper
Gertrud Wolle
Tibor Halmay as Ballet Master
Béla Fáy

Livia Miklós
Sándor Pethes
Eugen Rex as hotel porter

References

External links

1943 musical comedy films
German musical comedy films
Films of Nazi Germany
Films directed by Paul Martin
Films based on operettas
Operetta films
Films scored by Fred Raymond
German black-and-white films
1940s German-language films
1940s German films